Agnes Buen Garnås (born 23 October 1946) is a Norwegian folk singer from the county of Telemark. She comes from a famous musical family from the town of Jondal, and is known particularly for her singing of ancient unaccompanied Norwegian ballads, as well as her updated arrangements of these songs in collaboration with the Norwegian saxophonist Jan Garbarek on the ECM album Rosensfole.

From 1975 to 1977, she studied at the Telemark University College.

Other family members who are well known as traditional musicians include her brothers, Hauk Buen and Knut Buen, and her son Per Anders Buen Garnås.

Discography
Det spelar og syng i familien Buen, 1975
Når klokkune gjeve dur, 1976, 2002
Folk Music of Norway, 1977
Nordafjølls, 1983
På gamle tufter, with Sondre Bratland, Kåre Nordstoga, Guttorm *Guttormsen, Knut Buen, Halvor Håkanes, Warren Carlstrøm and Finn Kvalem, 1985
Jul med Rupesekken, 1985
Stem våre understrenger, with Knut Buens, 1988
Draumkvedet, with Inger Lise Ulsrud and Knut Buen, 1989
Tusseliten og Trippeliti, with Finn Kvalem, Guttorm Guttormsen, Knut Buen and Olav Snortheim, 1989
Rosensfole, with Jan Garbarek, 1989
Høgdepunkt frå Landskappleiken, 1994
Med blanke ark, 1994
Attersyn, with Knut Buen, 1995
Stev og slått, with Knut Buen, 1996
Det syng, with Anne Marit Jacobsen, Halvor Håkanes, Eli Storbekken and *Sinikka Langeland, 1997
Langt inn i hugheimen, with Knut Buen, 1997
Ljos og skugge, with Knut Buen, 1998
Soltreet, 2002
Han rider den mørke natt, 2002
With Jan Garbarek
Rosensfole (ECM, 1989)
Twelve Moons (ECM, 1992)

References

External links

Agnes Buen Garnås official site
Agnes Buen Garnås Biography Store Norske Leksikon (in Norwegian)
Agnes Buen Garnås page
Agnes Buen Garnås page (in Norwegian)
Agnes Buen Garnås video (Click on "Norway," then select Buen Garnås's video from the list.)

1946 births
Living people
Norwegian women singers
People from Telemark
People from Ullensvang
Telemark University College alumni